Carola Ciszewski (born 1 June 1968) is a German handball player. She participated at the 1992 Summer Olympics, where the German national team placed fourth.

References 
 Profile at sports-reference.com

1968 births
Living people
People from Merseburg
People from Bezirk Halle
German female handball players
Sportspeople from Saxony-Anhalt
Olympic handball players of Germany
Handball players at the 1992 Summer Olympics
20th-century German women